Bernhard II (17 December 1800, in Meiningen – 3 December 1882, in Meiningen) was a Duke of Saxe-Meiningen.

Family

He was the only son of Georg I Frederick Karl, Duke of Saxe-Meiningen and Luise Eleonore of Hohenlohe-Langenburg. Bernhard was a younger brother of Queen Adelaide of the United Kingdom and Ida, Princess Bernhard of Saxe-Weimar-Eisenach.

Bernhard succeeded his father when he was only three years old (1803); because of this, his mother, the Dowager Duchess Luise Eleonore, acted as regent on behalf of her son until he reached adulthood, in 1821.

Marriage

In Kassel on 23 March 1825, Bernhard II married Princess Marie Frederica of Hesse-Kassel (or Hesse-Cassel). They had two children:

On 12 November 1826, after the redistribution of all the family territories after the death of the last Duke of Saxe-Gotha-Altenburg, Bernhard II received Hildburghausen and Saalfeld.

A very kind family man and proud of his House, Bernhard was a thoughtful husband and father, as long as they obeyed him. In the Austro-Prussian War, he made a decision to side with the Habsburgs. When the Habsburgs lost the War, it cost Bernhard the Duchy. On 20 September 1866, Bernhard was forced to abdicate all his territories to his only son, Georg. He spent the rest of his days as a private citizen.

Ancestry

See also
 Altenstein Palace

References

External links

 Bernhard II at ADB (German)

1800 births
1882 deaths
Monarchs who abdicated
House of Saxe-Meiningen
Dukes of Saxe-Meiningen
People from Meiningen
Princes of Saxe-Meiningen
Grand Crosses of the Order of Saint Stephen of Hungary
Extra Knights Companion of the Garter